Bikali College is an institution of higher education located in the easternmost part of Goalpara district of western Assam. The college was established on 14 April 1982 by the rural masses of 52 numbers of villages under ‘Bikali Mauza Unnayan Samiti’ ( a socio-economic and cultural organization). The college is affiliated to Gauhati University.

History
Bikali college is named after "Bikali Mauza", which is a part of historical ‘Habraghat Pargana.’ The college is located under Dhupdhara part II at a distance of 0.75 km from the small market township Dhupdhara and NH 37. The pang of establishing the college was shouldered by the villagers and first meeting was held on 30 November 1974 under the presidentship of late Upendra Naryan Sarania wherein Anandi bala Rabha , the then MLA was nominated as president and Ismail Ali as Vice- president. The college was brought under deficit grant- in- aid system in 1992. As per suggestion and recommendation of the first NAAC peer team visit in 2004, Commerce stream was started and at present the stream is full fledged with Major courses in Accountancy, Finance and Management attracting students from neighboring areas and even from far flung places like West Garo Hills in Meghalaya. Of late, the college has also initiated Science education in + 2 level as there is emerging need for such education in the locality.

Departments

Arts
 Assamese
 English
 Education
 History
 Political Science

Commerce
 Finance
 Accounting
 Management

Science
 Mathematics
 Statistics
 Physics
 Zoology
 Botany
 Chemistry

Accreditation
In 2016 the college has been awarded 'B' grade by National Assessment and Accreditation Council. The college is also recognised by University Grants Commission (India).

Stream
The institution offers arts, commerce, science courses at the Higher Secondary Level and major in almost all the subjects have been introduced at Under Graduate level. P.G. course in Assamese and Geography has been successfully introduced along with career oriented programmers.

References

External links

Colleges affiliated to Gauhati University
Colleges in Assam
Educational institutions established in 1982
1982 establishments in Assam
Goalpara district